Zuria Vega (born Zuria Valeria Vega Sisto; January 10, 1989) is a Mexican actress and singer.

Early life
Vega was born and raised in Mexico City to Mexican actor Gonzalo Vega and a Spanish mother, Leonora Sisto. Her older sister is actress Marimar Vega and she has a brother. She has a half-sister from her father's previous relationship.

Acting career
Vega started her acting career as an extra in the play La señora presidente, which her father also starred and directed.  When she was 17 years old, she earned her first television acting role as "Roberta" in the Mexican drama series S.O.S.: Sexo y otros Secretos. In 2008 and 2009, she gained popularity in Mexico for her roles in the telenovelas Alma de hierro and Mar de amor, for which she starred as the lead. In 2010, she appeared in an episode of the third season of crime thriller series, Mujeres Asesinas 3.

In late 2013 and mid 2014, she starred in the successful comedy-drama telenovela, Qué pobres tan ricos alongside Jaime Camil. In November 2014, she was confirmed as the lead in the Televisa telenovela Que te perdone Dios. The telenovela is a remake of the popular 2000 Mexican telenovela Abrázame muy fuerte. Vega will star alongside Mexican actor Mark Tacher. Filming began on November 15, 2014, in San Miguel de Allende, Mexico and the program will air first on Univision, then Canal de las Estrellas in 2015. In 2017 she starred in the telenovela Mi Marido Tiene Familia opposite Daniel Arenas. Vega returned in the show's second season although only having small appearances after its mid run due to being pregnant.

Personal life
Vega began dating Cuban actor Alberto Guerra in August 2013. The couple married at a ceremony in San Francisco, Nayarit, Mexico on November 22, 2014. On January 11, 2017, she gave birth to a girl named Lua. On May 20, 2019, she gave birth to a boy named Luka.

Filmography

Film

Television

Stage

Awards and nominations

References

External links

Talent Agency Roster
Talent Agency Profile

1989 births
Living people
Mexican telenovela actresses
Mexican television actresses
Mexican film actresses
Mexican stage actresses
Actresses from Mexico City
Singers from Mexico City
21st-century Mexican actresses
Mexican people of Spanish descent
People from Mexico City
21st-century Mexican singers
21st-century Mexican women singers